Valentino Gasparella (born 30 June 1935) is a retired Italian track cyclist. He won a gold medal in the team pursuit at the 1956 Summer Olympics in Melbourne (with Antonio Domenicali, Leandro Faggin and Franco Gandini). In the 1000 m sprint he won the world title in 1958 and 1959, and two bronze medals: at the 1957 World Championships and 1960 Summer Olympics.

References

1935 births
Living people
Italian male cyclists
Olympic gold medalists for Italy
Olympic bronze medalists for Italy
Cyclists at the 1956 Summer Olympics
Cyclists at the 1960 Summer Olympics
Olympic cyclists of Italy
Italian track cyclists
Sportspeople from Vicenza
Olympic medalists in cycling
Medalists at the 1956 Summer Olympics
Medalists at the 1960 Summer Olympics
Cyclists from the Province of Vicenza